WCSC-TV (channel 5) is a television station in Charleston, South Carolina, United States, affiliated with CBS and owned by Gray Television. The station's studios are located in the West Ashley section of Charleston, and its transmitter is located in Awendaw, South Carolina. Both the studio and road are named for long-time WCSC personalities: Bill Sharpe, a news anchor from 1973 until his retirement in 2021, and Charlie Hall, the station's original personality who died just months before its relocation to the current facilities in 1997.

History
WCSC-TV began broadcasting on June 19, 1953. Originally operating from studios located on East Bay Street in downtown Charleston, it was the second television station in South Carolina and the oldest continuously operating station in the state (the first was WCOS-TV in Columbia, now WOLO-TV, which signed on in May 1953 and was off the air from 1956 to 1961). It is the only station in Charleston to keep its original network affiliation since sign-on. The channel aired an analog signal on VHF channel 5 and was originally owned by the Rivers family along with WCSC radio (AM 1390, now WSPO, and 96.9 FM, now WIWF).

Many of WCSC's early on-air staff were former radio disc jockeys who became involved with the new medium of television in 1953, including Al Stone, formerly recruited from WGAR who at the time worked alongside Alan Freed (Moondog) in Cleveland. Al Stone started with WCSC in 1952 as a radio DJ and the following year started hosting as emcee local program in 1953 called Waxworks and later a local popular American Bandstand-type dance show reviewing music for local teens. Carroll Godwin hosted a local daytime talk show in the 1960s. Loraine (Rainee) Evans hosted the popular children's program The Happy Raine Show. Ken Klyce was another popular news announcer.

The Rivers family sold WCSC-TV to Crump Communications of Houston in 1987 while the radio stations were sold to Ralph Guild of New York City. Crump kept the station until selling it to the Jefferson-Pilot Corporation in 1994. Jefferson-Pilot merged with the Lincoln Financial Group in 2006 with its broadcast properties assuming the new corporate name of Lincoln Financial Media. In 1997, the station moved to newly built studios on Charlie Hall Boulevard in the West Ashley section of Charleston. The street was named for WCSC's longtime weatherman, Charlie Hall, who had been the first person seen on the station when it signed on in 1953. One of the station's most popular personalities, Hall stayed at channel 5 there covering events including Hurricane Hugo's impact on Charleston in 1989 until his death in March 1997. Local sports coverage has also been prominent at WCSC. In the early 1980s, Charleston Cougars games were aired on the station. It aired the Cooper River Bridge Run from 1986 until 1990 and resumed the telecasts in 2004. The broadcasts feature reporters on the course.

WCSC was the local outlet for Atlantic Coast Conference basketball and Southeastern Conference football which have been produced by its parent company since the 1980s. In 2004, Jefferson-Pilot management effectively forced out Warren Peper (who had been with the station since 1974) by offering him only a one-year extension of his contract with no renewal option. The popular anchor, who had handled both news and sports during his time at WCSC, was also the play-by-play announcer for the station's live coverage of college basketball and the Cooper River Bridge Run.

After the station was sold to Jefferson-Pilot, Peper was a sideline reporter for the company's syndicated college football broadcasts. Peper went to Media General's WCBD-TV after a one-year non-compete agreement in the market expired. Viewers wrote that they hoped WCSC would not force out longtime anchors Bill Sharpe and Debi Chard in the same way. WCSC had lured meteorologist Bill Walsh away from rival WCIV in 1994 and had to hide his identity with thunderclouds when running station promotions during his non-compete agreement.

On November 12, 2007, Lincoln Financial Media entered into an agreement to sell WCSC and the company's two other television stations (WBTV in Charlotte, North Carolina and WWBT in Richmond, Virginia) and Lincoln Financial Sports to Raycom Media for $583 million. Raycom took ownership of the station on April 1, 2008. This made WCSC sister to WIS in Columbia, WTOC-TV in Savannah, Georgia and WMBF-TV in Myrtle Beach. Between them, the four stations cover the eastern two-thirds of South Carolina.

On October 3, 2013, in honor of Bill Sharpe's 40 years at the station, the studio was renamed the Bill Sharpe Studio.

On June 25, 2018, Gray Television announced its intent to acquire Raycom for $3.65 billion, pending regulatory approval. The sale was completed on January 2, 2019.

Programming

Syndicated programming
Syndicated programming on WCSC includes Inside Edition, Tamron Hall, Hot Bench and Right This Minute.

News operation
WCSC's newscasts have long dominated the ratings in Charleston. The station's various owners have always poured significant resources into the news department, resulting in a much higher-quality product than conventional wisdom would suggest for a market of Charleston's size. The station had the same two news anchors weeknights at 6:30 from the mid-1970s until 1991 and the same three news anchors were together until 1997. Bill Sharpe became an employee at the station in 1973 after a short time at WTMA and has been with the station for over 40 years, with the station naming the primary studio for him in 2013. For most of the time since 1991, he has been teamed with Debi Chard. Sharpe retired on October 28, 2021. WCSC has been a trend-setter in South Carolina for newscasts as it expanded its local evening news programming on weeknights from thirty minutes to two and a half hours and has the most newscasts in the state within a broadcast day.

After Fox requested its affiliates to air local news in the early 1990s, WTAT-TV (then owned by Act III Broadcasting) entered into a news share agreement with WCSC. This resulted in a nightly prime time broadcast known as The Fox 24 News at 10 to debut. It was the first prime time show in South Carolina, in the early 90s, followed by Fox affiliate WACH in Columbia which had a similar arrangement with NBC affiliate WIS, in that market, during the mid to late 90s. Eventually, an hour-long morning show on weekdays called The Fox 24 News at 7 also produced by WCSC launched on WTAT. Both shows originate from a secondary studio at 2126 Charlie Hall Boulevard (not the Sharpe studio). The 10 o'clock news is currently the second highest rated broadcast in the area.

In 1991, this station began airing a one-hour broadcast weeknights at 6 which later became ninety minutes from 5 to 6:30 followed by CBS Evening News in 1997. Prior to this, the national news aired at 7. In January 2000, WCSC launched its regional weather radar called "Live Super Doppler 5000". Now known as "Super Doppler HD", the system comprises four regional live NOAA National Weather Service radars and its own Collins radar sold by Advanced Designs Corporation in Bloomington, Indiana (which makes the station the only one in the market to operate its own radar). The station has often shared weather radars with fellow Raycom stations since the practice started after being purchased by Jefferson-Pilot.

In 2004, it added a thirty-minute newscast weekdays at 4 now totaling two hours of local broadcasts between 4:00 and 6:30. WCSC is the only station in the area to air local news at 4. In August 2006, with anchor and format changes at the CBS Evening News and concerns over ratings, it added a prime time show weeknights at 7 to "piggyback" with the network newscast. WCSC and ABC affiliate WCIV-DT2 are the only stations in the area to offer news in this time slot, and is similar to fellow Raycom stations in the Carolinas, following the lead of WIS, which has run 7 p.m. since 1963.

The station expanded its weather product with the "Live 5 Storm TRACKER Mobile Storm Center". It is the first vehicle of its kind in the region and allows WCSC meteorologists access to weather data away from the station and ability to send back live weather data for display on-air. On September 29, 2008, WCSC set another broadcasting benchmark in the area when it became the first to offer newscasts in high definition. The upgrade included new custom Raycom corporate graphics, a re-designed HD logo, and updated music package. The WTAT broadcasts were initially not included in the new HD production because that station was not yet equipped to broadcast local or syndicated programming in high definition. As of January 24, 2011, the WTAT news shows are now in HD. Starting August 31, 2009, the weeknight prime time show at 10 on WTAT was expanded to an hour and added a second news anchor.

On January 25, 2014, WCSC-TV expanded its news presence, again, by adding a Saturday and Sunday morning broadcast of Live 5 News This Morning from 6 a.m. to 8 a.m.

On December 31, 2015, WCSC-TV produced its last broadcast for WTAT-TV (with production for that station moving to sister station WCIV). WCSC-TV began producing an expansion to Live 5 News on its Bounce digital subchannel from 7 a.m. to 8 a.m. The station also began airing a 7:30 p.m. newscast, in late November, weeknights to bring its 7 p.m. news to a full hour.

Notable former on-air staff
Bill Sharpe – anchor (1973-2021)
Ben Mankiewicz – later at TMZ and now at Turner Classic Movies and current co-host of The Young Turks.

Technical information

Subchannels
The station's digital signal is multiplexed:

WCSC-TV launched a second subchannel on January 8, 2010, that carries additional programming, branded as Live 5+. Until 2013, the schedule consisted of additional syndicated programming (some of which has moved to other stations) as well as select programming from the main channel aired on 5.2. On December 26, 2013, select programming from This TV was added the channel. As of 2016, syndicated programs are no longer seen on the schedule. WCSC-TV added Bounce TV to 5.3 upon its launch on September 26, 2011.

Analog-to-digital conversion 
WCSC-TV shut down its analog signal, over VHF channel 5, at 6 a.m. on June 12, 2009, as part of the federally mandated transition from analog to digital television. Reporter Bill Burr and chief meteorologist Bill Walsh conducted the switch inside the transmitter room during the station's morning newscast. The station's digital signal remained on its pre-transition UHF channel 47, using PSIP to display WCSC-TV's virtual channel as 5 on digital television receivers.

On June 1, 2018, as part of the repacking process, WCSC-TV moved its digital signal to channel 19.

Out-of-market cable and CATV carriage
Outside of the Charleston area, WCSC is carried on Horry Telephone Cooperative's cable system in the Northern Grand Strand and the rural portions of Horry County alongside WBTW. To the north, it is carried in southern Florence and Orangeburg counties. Although Orangeburg is part of the Columbia market, WCSC usually trounces WLTX and current sister station WIS in ratings, especially since the local sports teams are in the same region with Charleston, not Columbia, area schools. An attempt to drop this channel from Orangeburg in 1997 while WLTX was contemplating a full-time move to UPN led to protests that resulted in the station's restoration in 1999. Raycom has effectively assigned the Orangeburg area to WCSC rather than WIS. To the south, it is carried in most of the South Carolina side of the Savannah market including Beaufort, Bluffton, and Hilton Head Island.

There is no out-of-market carriage on DirecTV or Dish Network for WCSC. Appling County, Georgia in the far western end of the Savannah market has this station listed as significantly viewed by the Federal Communications Commission (FCC). This also includes independent station WJXT in Jacksonville, Florida. It is the only county in Georgia listed by the FCC that picks up WCSC.

CATV
During the 1970s and 1980s, WCSC was once carried in the cities of Dillon, Marion, and Olanta in the Pee Dee region of South Carolina. In Georgia, it was once carried in the cities of Statesboro and Sylvania, Screven County.

References

External links
 WCSC-TV "Live 5"

CSC-TV
CBS network affiliates
Bounce TV affiliates
Circle (TV network) affiliates
Grit (TV network) affiliates
Quest (American TV network) affiliates
Ion Mystery affiliates
Gray Television
Television channels and stations established in 1953
1953 establishments in South Carolina